Télimélé is a prefecture located in the Kindia Region of Guinea. The capital is Télimélé. The prefecture covers an area of 9,216 km.² and has an estimated population of 284,409.

Sub-prefectures
The prefecture is divided administratively into 14 sub-prefectures:
 Télimélé-Centre
 Bourouwal
 Daramagnaky
 Gougoudjé
 Koba
 Kollet
 Konsotamy
 Missira
 Santou
 Sarékaly
 Sinta
 Sogolon
 Tarihoye
 Thionthian

Prefectures of Guinea
Kindia Region